Kiss and Tell or Kiss & Tell or Kiss n Tell may refer to:

Books
 a kiss-and-tell biography, an unauthorized biography written by a friend or confidant of the subject
 Kiss and Tell (play), a 1943 Broadway play by F. Hugh Herbert
Kiss and Tell, a 2000 romance novel by Cherry Adair
Kiss and Tell, a 2004 non-fiction book about kissing by Julie Enfield
Sex and the City: Kiss and Tell, a companion guide to the TV show by Amy Sohn

Film and television 
Kiss and Tell (1945 film), a Richard Wallace film based on the 1943 play
Kiss & Tell (1996 film), a 1996 independent feature starring Heather Graham
Kiss and Tell (1996 film), a 1996 TV film, directed by Andy Wolk
Kiss and Tell (2011 film), a 2011 film directed by Desmond Elliot
"Kiss and Tell", an episode of Young Americans
"Kiss and Tell", an episode from season 1 of Gilmore Girls

Music

Albums
Kiss & Tell (Selena Gomez & the Scene album), and a song from that album, 2009
Kiss & Tell (Sahara Hotnights album), 2004

Songs
"Kiss 'n' Tell" (Chantoozies song), 1988
"Kiss and Tell" (Bryan Ferry song), 1988
"Kiss and Tell" (You Me at Six song), 2009
Kiss & Tell (Angels & Airwaves song), 2019
"Kiss n Tell", a song by Kesha from Animal (2010)
"Kiss & Tell", a song by Peter Andre from Accelerate (2010)
"Kiss & Tell", a song by Justin Bieber from My World 2.0 (2010)
"Kiss and Tell", a song by Brownstone from Still Climbing (1997)
"Kiss and Tell", a song by Isley-Jasper-Isley from Broadway's Closer to Sunset Blvd (1984)
"Kiss and Tell", a song by Crystal Lewis from Fearless (2000)

See also
Kiss and Tell collective, a British Columbia-based performance and artist collective